In Battle is an extreme metal band from Sundsvall, Sweden. The main lyrical themes of the band focus on Norse mythology and war.

History
The original line-up consisted of John Frölén on guitar and bass, John Odhinn Sandin on vocals, Håkan Sjödin on guitar and bass, and Otto Wiklund on drums. Håkan Sjödin left the band early so that he could play with Setherial full-time. The band's first album, titled In Battle, was recorded at Sunlight Studio in Stockholm, Sweden and was released through Napalm Records in 1997. Their second release, called The Rage of the Northmen, came in March 1998. It was recorded at Ballerina Audio, Umeå, Sweden. In 1999 the only member left was Frölén, who started writing material for a third album. In 2002 he began rehearsing with Sandin (this time on drums), soon asking Hans Carlsson (guitar) of Diabolical to join the band. In 2003, Nils Fjellström of Aeon replaced Sandin on drums and Sandin went back to handling the vocals and the Soul Metamorphosis EP was recorded at Necromorbus Studio in Stockholm, Sweden. In 2004, their album Welcome to the Battlefield (which was recorded in three different studios) was released through Cold Records and Metal Blade Records. The album was mixed and mastered by Erik Rutan from the bands Morbid Angel and Hate Eternal. Rutan also donated a guitar solo to the album. In April 2005, the band parted ways with their label partner Cold Records after that album's release. In 2006, In Battle signed a contract with Nocturnal Art Productions and began working on their 4th full-length album, which turned out to be Kingdom of Fear. The album was released on September 3, 2007. In Battle are currently working on a fifth studio album with a working title of Flames & Death.

Line-up

Current members
Source:
John Odhinn Sandin - vocals (1996–1998, 2002–present)
John Frölén - bass (formerly guitar) (1996–present)
Hasse Karlsson - guitar (2002–present)
Nils Fjellström - drums (2003–present)

Former members
Håkan Sjödin (aka Mysteriis) - guitar/bass (1996–1997)
Otto Wiklund - drums/vocals (1996–1998)
Marcus Edvardsson - bass (2003)

Discography
In Battle (full-length, 1997)
The Rage of the Northmen (full-length, 1999)
Soul Metamorphosis (EP, 2003)
Welcome to the Battlefield (full-length, 2004)
Kingdom of Fear (full-length, 2007)
Flames & Death (full-length, TBA)

References

Musical groups established in 1996
Swedish death metal musical groups
Swedish black metal musical groups
Swedish viking metal musical groups